Derek Hall may refer to:

Derek Hall (Australian footballer) (born 1970), Australian rules footballer
Derek Hall (cricketer) (1932–1983), English cricketer
Derek Hall (footballer, born 1965), English footballer
Derek Hall (academic) (1924–1975), president of Corpus Christi College, Oxford